Lorne Leibel (born 14 January 1951) is a Canadian sailor and one of Canada’s wealthiest real estate developers. He competed in the Tempest event at the 1976 Summer Olympics. In 2006, he was inducted into the Canadian Motorsport Hall of Fame. Nevertheless, the two were allowed to continue to participate and after seven races they still managed seventh place in the final classification.

His younger son Blake Leibel was convicted of first degree murder and was sentenced to life imprisonment without parole.

References

External links
 

1951 births
Living people
Canadian male sailors (sport)
Olympic sailors of Canada
Sailors at the 1976 Summer Olympics – Tempest
Sportspeople from Toronto